Alexander Kogler (born 1 February 1998) is an Austrian footballer who plays as a striker.

Career 

Kogler started his career at FC Kärnten. In 2007 he switched to SK Austria Kärnten. In 2008 he moved to the youth team of FC Wacker Innsbruck. In 2013 he came to AKA Carinthia. In 2014 he moved to Germany at FC Rot-Weiß Erfurt.

For the 2016/17 season, he joined the U-19 team of FC Ingolstadt 04. He made his debut for Ingolstadt's second team in the Regionalliga in July 2017 when he started against FC Bayern Munich's second team on the first day of the 2017/18 season. On his debut, however, he received a red card in the 43rd minute and was sent off. He scored his first goal for Ingolstadt II in September 2017 in a 2-1 win against the second team of 1. FC Nürnberg. At the end of the season he had 27 appearances in the regional league, in which he scored five goals.

For the 2018/19 season, he returned to Austria and joined the second team of FC Wacker Innsbruck. He made his debut in the 2nd division in July 2018 when he started against FC Juniors OÖ on the first day of the 2018/19 season and was replaced by Robert Martić in the 70th minute. In the game that Innsbruck won 3-0, Kogler scored to make it 1-0.

After relegation at Wacker II, he switched to second division Grazer AK for the 2019/20 season. He made 10 appearances in the first half of the season in the Austrian Football Second League before departing the club to sign for Irish side Finn Harps F.C.

In February 2020, Kogler signed for Finn Harps in the League of Ireland Premier Division. He scored twice for the Donegal side in their FAI Cup second round clash with Bray Wanderers. He left the club at the end of 2020.

Personal life 
Kogler is the son of former Austria international footballer Walter Kogler.

References

External links
 

1998 births
Living people
Austrian footballers
Austrian expatriate footballers
Association football midfielders
Regionalliga players
2. Liga (Austria) players
League of Ireland players
FC Kärnten players
SK Austria Kärnten players
FC Wacker Innsbruck (2002) players
FC Rot-Weiß Erfurt players
FC Ingolstadt 04 players
FC Ingolstadt 04 II players
Grazer AK players
Finn Harps F.C. players
Austrian expatriate sportspeople in Germany
Austrian expatriate sportspeople in Ireland
Expatriate footballers in Germany
Expatriate association footballers in the Republic of Ireland
People from Oberwart
Footballers from Burgenland